The large seal script or great seal script is a traditional reference to Chinese writing from before the Qin dynasty (i.e. before 221 BCE), and is now popularly understood to refer narrowly to the writing of the Western and early Eastern Zhou dynasties (i.e. 1046–403 BCE), and more broadly to also include the oracle bone script (c.1250–1000 BCE). The term is in contrast to the name of the official script of the Qin dynasty, which is often called the small or lesser seal script (小篆 Xiǎozhuàn, also termed simply seal script). However, due to the lack of precision in the term, scholars often avoid it and instead refer more specifically to the provenance of particular examples of writing.

In the Han dynasty (202 BCE – 220 CE), when clerical script became the popular form of writing and (small) seal script was relegated to more formal usage such as on signet seals and for the titles of stelae (inscribed stone memorial tablets which were popular at the time), the people began to refer to the earlier Qin dynasty script as 'seal' script (due to the continued use on signet seals, or name chops). At that time, there was still knowledge of even older, often more complex graphs (dating to the middle to late Zhou dynasty, and directly ancestral to the Qin forms) which differed from the Qin seal script forms, but which resembled them in their rounded, seal-script-like style (as opposed to the squared, rectilinear clerical script style). As a result, two terms emerged to describe them: 'greater seal script' for the more complex, earlier forms, and 'small seal script' for the Qin dynasty forms.

It is only more recently that the term 'greater seal script' has been extended to refer to Western Zhou forms or even oracle bone script, of which the Han dynasty coiners of this term were unaware. The term 'large seal script' is also sometimes traditionally identified with a group of characters from a book c. 800 BCE entitled Shizhoupian, preserved by their inclusion in the Han dynasty lexicon, the Shuowen Jiezi. Xu Shen, the author of Shuowen, included these when they differed from the structures of the Qin (small) seal script, and labelled the examples Zhòuwén or Zhòu graphs. This name comes from the name of the book and not the name of a script. Thus, it is not correct to refer to the c. 800 BCE Zhōu dynasty script as Zhòuwén. Similarly, the Zhòu graphs are merely examples of large seal script when that term is used in a broad sense.

See also
 Seal script
 Small seal script

References 

Chén Zhāoróng (陳昭容) Research on the Qín (Ch'in) Lineage of Writing: An Examination from the Perspective of the History of Chinese Writing (秦系文字研究 ﹕从漢字史的角度考察) (2003). Academia Sinica, Institute of History and Philology Monograph (中央研究院歷史語言研究所專刊). . (in Chinese)
Qiu Xigui Chinese Writing (2000). Translation of 文字學概要 by Gilbert L. Mattos and Jerry Norman. Early China Special Monograph Series No. 4. Berkeley: The Society for the Study of Early China and the Institute of East Asian Studies, University of California, Berkeley. .

History of the Chinese script
East Asian calligraphy
Chinese script style